Kingsley Bryce (born 16 April 1993) is an American soccer player who last played for Chicago Fire in Major League Soccer.

NCAA career

After playing soccer for Jesuit Prep in Dallas and leading the team to an undefeated championship season Bryce enrolled to the Saint Louis University to play men's soccer. In his freshman year with the Billikens, Bryce started all 17 games collecting 5 points (3 goals and two assists). In his sophomore season Bryce to the Atlantic 10 Conference by storm recording 17 points and named the Most Outstanding Player of the Atlantic Ten Championship leading the Billikens to the A-10 Championship. He also led his team to the 2012 NCAA Division I Men's Soccer Championship where they were ranked 8th and received an automatic bye from the first round. Although receiving the bye they were eliminated in their first match against Fairleigh Dickinson University 2-1 in overtime. In his junior season Bryce once again was named the A-10 Championship's Most Outstanding player and was third on the Saint Louis squad in points leading his team to the A-10 conference championship game where they won. In his senior season Bryce started all 21 games was selected for All-Academic and was a finalist for the Senior CLASS Award. Bryce led his team to the 2014 NCAA Division I Men's Soccer Championship where they reached the second round due to Bryce's great performances.

Professional career
After his four seasons with the Billikens, Bryce entered the 2015 MLS SuperDraft, where the Chicago Fire selected him in the second round with the 28th overall pick.

On May 28, 2015, Bryce (along with teammate Mike Magee) was sent on loan to Chicago's USL affiliate club Saint Louis FC. He made his professional debut during a 1-1 draw against Harrisburg City Islanders on June 13, 2015. After initially exercising his contract option for 2016, the Fire waived Bryce on March 2, 2016.

NCAA statistics

References

External links
 https://www.facebook.com/kingsley.bryce.7/ Official Facebook

1993 births
Living people
American soccer players
Association football midfielders
Chicago Fire FC draft picks
Chicago Fire FC players
Jesuit College Preparatory School of Dallas alumni
Saint Louis Billikens men's soccer players
Saint Louis FC players
Soccer players from Texas
Sportspeople from Plano, Texas
USL Championship players